Shanghaied In Astoria is a musical melodrama that is performed by the Astor Street Opry Company every summer in Astoria, Oregon, United States. It has run since 1984, and has been attended by over 55,000 people. Traditionally the play is performed three days a week from July to September. It is recommended by a leading travel guide.

The unpaid cast draws from locals, some which are well known, such as the Clatsop County District attorney who plays a bit part as sheriff.  Support from benefactors such as the Ford Family Foundation are helping the production to move to a new theater for 2008.

Plot summary
The story is set in 1904 Astoria around the Scandinavian Midsummer Festival. 
The Norwegian hero, Eric Olson must rescue his sweetheart Miss Virginia Sweet from Max Krooke, her ward.

References

External links
 Shanghaied Homepage
 Former Cast MySpace group
 Video from the play
Frommer's listing

American plays
Culture of Astoria, Oregon
Fiction set in 1904
Plays set in Oregon
Melodramas
1984 plays